"Jump, Jive an' Wail" is a 1956 jazz swing song by Louis Prima. It first appeared on his album The Wildest! and became one of his signature songs.

Background
Keely Smith, Prima's wife at that time, was one of the backup singers on the song. The song had a resurgence in popularity during the swing revival in the late 1990s.

Cover versions
The Brian Setzer Orchestra covered the song on their 1998 album The Dirty Boogie. In 1999, Setzer's cover won the Grammy Award for Best Pop Performance by a Duo or Group with Vocals at the 41st Grammy Awards.

Popular culture
Louis Prima's version is used in the 2008 film Igor.
The 1998 version was featured in the Stuart Little and Jonah: A VeggieTales Movie trailers.
The 1998 version was seen as an archive footage clip was featured during the music "Dickie's Dream" by Count Basie in the final episode, "A Masterpiece by Midnight" from the 2001 Ken Burns documentary ''Jazz.
The Gap used Prima's version in a "Khakis Swing" commercial in 1998.

References

External links

Swing music
1956 songs
1998 singles
Songs written by Louis Prima